Doris Lenea Pryor (born 1977) is an American lawyer who is serving as a United States circuit judge of the United States Court of Appeals for the Seventh Circuit. She served as a United States magistrate judge for the Southern District of Indiana from 2018 to 2022.

Education 

Pryor was born in Hope, Arkansas. She received a Bachelor of Science from the University of Central Arkansas in 1999 and a Juris Doctor from the Indiana University Maurer School of Law in 2003.

Career 

After graduating law school, Pryor served as a law clerk for Chief Judge Lavenski Smith of the United States Court of Appeals for the Eighth Circuit from 2003 to 2004 and for Judge J. Leon Holmes of the United States District Court for the Eastern District of Arkansas from 2004 to 2005. From 2005 to 2006, she served as Deputy Public Defender for the Arkansas Public Defender's Commission. From 2006 to 2018, she served as an Assistant United States Attorney for the U.S. Attorney's Office for the Southern District of Indiana. She served as National Security Chief for the office from 2014 to 2018. Pryor co-founded the REACH program, a re-entry program that guides and supports former offenders who are at greater risk of returning to prison, in the Southern Indiana District Court.

Federal judicial service 

On November 17, 2017, Pryor was selected to serve as a United States Magistrate Judge to fill the vacancy left by the death of Magistrate Judge Denise K. LaRue. She served as United States magistrate judge for the United States District Court for the Southern District of Indiana from March 1, 2018 to December 9, 2022.

On May 25, 2022, President Joe Biden nominated Pryor to serve as a United States circuit judge of the United States Court of Appeals for the Seventh Circuit. President Biden nominated Pryor to the seat to be vacated by Judge David F. Hamilton, who would assume senior status upon confirmation of his successor. Senator Todd Young announced his support of Pryor's nomination in a statement shortly after President Biden nominated her. On July 13, 2022, a hearing on her nomination was held before the Senate Judiciary Committee. She is the first Biden appellate court nominee to receive support from a state's two Republican senators. On August 4, 2022, her nomination was reported out of committee by a 13–9 vote. On December 1, 2022, the United States Senate invoked cloture on her nomination by a 62–31 vote. On December 5, 2022, her nomination was confirmed by a 60–31 vote. She is the first African American woman from Indiana to serve on the 7th Circuit. Pryor is the ninth African-American woman confirmed as a U.S. circuit judge nominated by President Biden. Prior to the start of the Presidency of Joe Biden, there were previously eight African-American woman circuit court judges in history. She received her judicial commission on December 9, 2022.

See also 
 List of African-American federal judges
 List of African-American jurists

References

External links 

1977 births
Living people
21st-century American judges
21st-century American women judges
21st-century American women lawyers
21st-century American lawyers
African-American judges
African-American lawyers
Assistant United States Attorneys
Indiana University Maurer School of Law alumni
Judges of the United States Court of Appeals for the Seventh Circuit
People from Hope, Arkansas
Public defenders
United States court of appeals judges appointed by Joe Biden
United States magistrate judges
University of Central Arkansas alumni